Raach am Hochgebirge is a town in the district of Neunkirchen in the Austrian state of Lower Austria.

Population

References

Cities and towns in Neunkirchen District, Austria